Georges Quéritet was a Belgian international football player. Having been striker in Royal Football Club de Liège and later in Racing Club de Bruxelles, he also played the first official match of the Belgium national team against France on 1 May 1904. The encounter resulted in a 3–3 draw and Quéritet scored twice, from which the first official goal of the Red Devils in the 7th minute.

In spite of his two goals in that match, his first international appearance would also be his last selection for Belgium.

References

External links
 

1882 births
Belgian footballers
RFC Liège players
Belgium international footballers
Association football forwards
K.F.C. Rhodienne-De Hoek players
1963 deaths